The Forest of Dean by-election was a Parliamentary by-election held on 24 February 1911. It returned one Member of Parliament (MP)  to the House of Commons of the Parliament of the United Kingdom, elected by the first past the post voting system.

Previous result

Candidates
Liberal Party Henry Webb
Conservative Party David Hope Kyd

Result

Aftermath
Webb was appointed as a Junior Whip in 1912, which required him to face the electorate again, when he was returned unopposed.  A general election was due to take place by the end of 1915. By the autumn of 1914, the following candidates had been adopted [*approved but not adopted] to contest that election. Due to the outbreak of war, the election never took place. 

At the 1918 general election, Webb received the coupon of endorsement from the Coalition government.

References

1911 in England
1911 elections in the United Kingdom
Forest of Dean
By-elections to the Parliament of the United Kingdom in Gloucestershire constituencies
20th century in Gloucestershire